Baptist Temple is a historic Baptist church at 360 Schermerhorn Street in Brooklyn, New York.  It was built in 1893–1894 in the Romanesque Revival style and rebuilt after a fire in 1917–1918. It has a brownstone base and superstructure faced with subtly textured brick with brownstone trim.  The building features a large rose window and three corner towers.

It is a work of architects Weary & Kramer, and it is a work of Dodge & Morrison.

It was listed on the National Register of Historic Places in 1995.  The historic pipe organ was undergoing a multi-year restoration at the time.  It was seriously damaged in a three-alarm fire that broke out on July 7, 2010.

References

Baptist churches in New York City
Churches completed in 1894
19th-century Baptist churches in the United States
Churches in Brooklyn
Properties of religious function on the National Register of Historic Places in Brooklyn